Aphelenchoididae is a nematode family in the order Aphelenchida.

List of genera 
Subfamily Anomyctinae
 Genus Anomyctus

Subfamily Aphelenchoidinae
 Genus Aphelenchoides
 Genus Ficophagus
 Genus Laimaphelenchus
 Genus Martininema
 Genus Robustodorus
 Genus Punchaulus
 Genus Ruehmaphelenchus
 Genus Schistonchus
 Genus Sheraphelenchus
 Genus Tylaphelenchus

Incertae sedis:
 Genus Pseudaphelenchus
 Genus Ptychaphelenchus

References

External links 

 
Nematode families